Donnchadh of Lennox was the Mormaer of Lennox, 1385–1425. He was a son of Baltar mac Amlaimh and Margaret, daughter of Domhnall, Earl of Lennox.

When Domhnall of Lennox died in 1365, Donnchadh's mother Margaret became ruler of Lennox. It had been Domhnall's intention that the marriage would eventually allow the succession of a son, i.e. Donnchadh, but it is probable that Baltar intended to rule in his turn. It is not known how relations deteriorated, but it seems that Donnchadh got impatient. In the summer of 1384, King Robert II issued two charters formally conferring the Mormaerdom on Baltar. However, a year later he and his wife Margaret resigned the Mormaerdom over to their eldest son Donnchadh, and hence Donnchadh became ruler. However, in 1388, Baltar and Margaret were handed custody of the Mormaerdom for the remainder of their lives, with Donnchadh retaining the title. Donnchadh was confined to a stronghold in Loch Lomond, Inchmurrin castle.

Donnchadh was forced to form strong ties with the great Robert Stewart, who was the second son of King Robert II by his first wife Elizabeth Mure of Rowallan, and who ruled much of Scotland. In 1392, Donnchadh met Robert at Inchmurrin and agreed to marry his daughter Isabella to Robert's son, Muiredach if Robert could secure him the Mormaerdom. As Domhnall was heirless, the deal ensured that the Mormaerdom would pass to the Stewarts upon Donnchadh's death. It took much of the 1390s, but nevertheless Robert managed to secure his part of the bargain.

Donnchadh hence became a part of the Albany Stewart nexus when the Earl of Albany acted as regent during King James's imprisonment in England. Albany refused to ransom King James and tried to prevent his return. After the king's return, they challenged the crown's authority. These Stewart ties led to Donnchadh's downfall. In 1425, he raised his men of Lennox in a revolt against King James I in support of Muiredach and his son Walter and was executed.

He was the last male ruler of his line.

Marriage and issue
During the life of his father Baltar, Donnchadh forged ties with his Argyll neighbours, and married Helen, the daughter of Archibald Campbell of Lochawe. Countess Helen was widow of a John of the Isles, son of John of Islay.

By Helen of the Isles, Lennox had issue:

Isabella, Countess of Lennox; married Murdach Stewart, Earl of Fife
Elizabeth; married (c. 1406) John Stewart of Darnley, Lord of Aubigny, Concressault and Count of Évreux.
Margaret; married (c. 25 July 1392) Robert Menteith 
Earl Donnchadh also had four natural sons:

Malcolm
Thomas
Donald Lennox of Balcarroch (apparently legitimated)
William

Notes

Bibliography
Balfour Paul, Sir James, Scots Peerage IX vols. Edinburgh 1904.
 Brown, Michael, "Earldom and Kindred: The Lennox and Its Earls, 1200-1458" in Steve Boardman and Alasdair Ross (eds.) The Exercise of Power in Medieval Scotland, c.1200-1500, (Dublin/Portland, 2003), pp. 201–224

1425 deaths
People from Stirling
Executed Scottish people
People executed by Stuart Scotland
Year of birth unknown
14th-century Scottish earls
15th-century executions
Mormaers of Lennox